Thray Sithu of Myinsaing (– 1426) was a Burmese royal who served as a senior minister at the court of Ava from 1400 to 1426. He was also Ava's wartime Viceroy of Arakan for a few months in 1408–1409. 

His role was most prominent during the reign of his half-uncle King Minkhaung I (r. 1400–1421). The prince twice led the peace negotiations with the southern Hanthawaddy Kingdom in 1403 and 1408 during the Forty Years' War. During the Ava succession crisis of 1425–1426, he supported his cousin King Min Nyo (r. 1425–1426), and commanded a depleted royal army against the forces of Governor Thado of Mohnyin. He suffered two consecutive defeats in battle in 1426, and is not mentioned again in the chronicles.

Early life
Probably born in the early 1370s, Thray Sithu was the second child of Prince Sithu Min Oo of Pinya and Princess Minkhaung Medaw of Ava. His father was a son of King Uzana I of Pinya (r. 1325–1340) and his mother was a daughter of King Swa Saw Ke of Ava (r. 1367–1400). The prince apparently was held in high regard by King Swa who appointed his grandson to be governor of Myinsaing, the ancestral home of Pinya–Sagaing–Ava dynasties, . He had one older brother Sithu Thanbawa, who held the "Five Irrigated Districts" (ရေလွှဲ ငါးခရိုင်; present-day Yamethin District and surrounding regions) in fief.

Career

Forty Years' War
His career was shaped by Ava's Forty Years' War (1385–1423) against the southern Hanthawaddy Kingdom. Like senior princes of the day, he (and his brother) started out in the royal army, as regimental commanders, and saw action in the third campaign (1390–1391) of the war. When the war was renewed in 1401, he had moved into the Ava high command, as a senior adviser to the then new king Minkhaung I. In January 1403, he led the Ava delegation that negotiated the initial ceasefire with the Hanthawaddy delegation led by Gen. Byat Za at the border. (The eventual peace treaty was negotiated by Chief Minister Min Yaza five months later.)

His second, certainly more famous, ceasefire negotiation came in August 1408. The peace treaty of 1403 had been broken by King Razadarit of Hanthawaddy in March/April 1408 when a Hanthawaddy army overthrew the Ava-installed king Anawrahta from Arakan (present-day Rakhine State). Furious, King Minkhaung, despite his advisers' strenuous objections, launched an invasion of the southern country in May 1408 right before the rainy season. When the invasion predictably got bogged down in the Irrawaddy delta three months into the campaign, the king sent a delegation led by Thray Sithu to negotiate a ceasefire. The first and only meeting of the negotiation was famous in Burmese history for the Hanthawaddy commander Lagun Ein's honest response to a routine question by the Ava commander Thado if Pegu was negotiating in good faith. Lagun Ein is said to have answered with brutal honesty: "Fool, this is war. You'll kill me if you can. I'll kill you if I can. How can you trust anyone?" Thray Sithu promptly broke off the negotiations. The Ava forces withdrew in total disarray with great loss of life.

After the disastrous invasion, Thray Sithu was sent to retake Arakan. According to the Arakanese chronicle Rakhine Razawin Thit, the Ava army led by the lord of Myinsaing briefly retook the Arakanese capital Launggyet in 1408. But he could not hold Launggyet when a Hanthawaddy army returned later in the dry season. The Ava forces fell back to a border fort near Nga Khwe-Thin Taung. Thray Sithu did not remain in Arakan; the Ava fort was commanded by Letya of Phaunglin for the next three years. It was Thray Sithu's last known campaign in the Forty Years' War, which ended in 1423. He is not mentioned in the subsequent campaigns of the war in any capacity in the chronicles.

Succession crisis (1425–1426)
The prince's last military campaign came during the Ava succession crisis of 1425–1426. He supported his cousin Prince Min Nyo of Kale who seized the throne in November 1425, after his allies had assassinated kings Thihathu and Min Hla within a three-month span. When Governor Thado of Mohnyin formally revolted in February 1426, Thray Sithu along with Governor Le Than Bwa of Onbaung agreed to lead the fight for Nyo.

Despite the preparations, Thissein fell quickly after a daring surprise attack from the river side by Thado's sons. The fort's defenses, which included 50 war boats, had not expected an attack by the Mohnyin navy as the main Mohnyin army had not yet shown up. Indeed, after the capture of Thissein, the sons had to wait for their father's army to arrive for another ten days. At Thissein, Thado paused, and recruited more troops from the region. Then the enlarged forces of Mohnyin attacked Wetchet, where Thray Sithu and his deputy Sokkate were waiting with 3000 troops. Ava troops put up a fight but the town eventually fell. Thray Sithu and Sokkate either fell in action or were captured as they are not mentioned in the chronicles afterwards.

Ancestry
Prince Thray Sithu was descended from the Ava–Pinya–Myinsaing royal lines, and ultimately the Pagan royalty from both sides.

Notes

References

Bibliography

Ava dynasty
1370s births
1426 deaths